or  is a village in Narvik Municipality in Nordland county, Norway. Kjeldebotn Church is located in Kjeldebotn.

References

External links
http://www.kjeldebotn.com 

Ballangen
Villages in Nordland
Populated places of Arctic Norway